Kadavumbhagam Mattancherry Synagogue aka Kadavumbhagam Synagogue ( Mal: കടവു൦ഭാഗ൦ മട്ടാഞ്ചേരി ജൂതപള്ളി or കടവു൦ഭാഗ൦ ജൂതപള്ളി ) is a Jewish synagogue located in Mattancherry, a locality in Kochi, in the coastal state of Kerala. It is one of the oldest extant synagogues in India, built in 1544 A.D. It was built by the Malabar Jews who are the oldest jewish settlers in India, believed to have arrived as traders in the ancient port city of Muziris. It was the second to be built in Mattancherry, after the Kochangadi Palli in 1344 A. D., and is one of three synagogues in the area. The others being the Thekkumbhagam Mattancherry Synagogue (1647 A.D) (extinct) and the Paradesi Synagogue (1568 A.D) of the Paradesi jews of Cochin.

The name of the synagogue is believed to refer to a much older synagogue that once stood in Kodungaloor. This synagogue is considered as one of the most ornately carved and decorated Malabar Synagogues in Kerala, particularly its wooden furnishes and interior sanctuary. The name means "by the riverside" and refers to a boat dock that stood opposite the complex until the 1960's. This palli (synagogue) was renowned for its divine miracles and stories associated and was revered by both the Malabar Jews and non Jewish locals.

In 1955, the entire congregation made aliyah to Israel leaving the synagogue in disuse. It was initially encroached upon and later made into a warehouse for coir storage. The interior furniture and women's bimah were shipped and preserved in the Israel Museum while it's hekal is presently in moshav Nehalim in Israel.

In September 2019, after decades of neglect, the entire front portion of the sanctuary collapsed in the heavy monsoon rainfall. After much public outcry, the Kerala Archaeology Department took possession of the monument to save it. Currently it is being restored to function as a heritage museum.

See also 
 Anjuvannam
 Chendamangalam Synagogue
 Cochin Jews
 Gathering of Israel
 History of the Jews in India
 Judaism
 List of synagogues in Kerala
 Muziris

References 

Mattancherry
Synagogues in Kerala
Cochin Jews